Aiki is a Maban language of Chad. It consists of two dialects, Runga and Kibet, which are divergent enough to be considered separate languages. Kibet (Kibeit, Kibeet, Kabentang) is spoken in Chad, while Runga (Roungo) is split between Chad and the CAR. Ayki (Aykindang) is a name used in CAR.

Possible dialects of Kibet are Dagal (Dagel, Daggal) and Muru (Murru, Muro, Mourro); however, they are poorly known, and Blench (2012) lists them separately.

The Aiki area is flooded half the year.

References

Maban languages
Languages of Chad